Elections to the Mizoram Legislative Assembly were held in November 1989 to elect members of the 40 constituencies in Mizoram, India. The Indian National Congress won the majority of seats and its leader in Mizoram, Lal Thanhawla was appointed as the Chief Minister of Mizoram; his second time in the role.

In 1987, the Mizo National Front won the elections and started governing for their 5-year term. But, within 18 months, there were defections from the party, by members who wanted Cabinet positions, which reduced the government to a minority in the Assembly. President's rule was imposed on Mizoram, in September 1988 and elections were called for in 1989.

Result

Elected Members

See also 
 List of constituencies of the Mizoram Legislative Assembly

References

Mizoram
1989
1989